The red phalarope or grey phalarope (Phalaropus fulicarius) is a small wader. This phalarope breeds in the Arctic regions of North America and Eurasia. It is migratory, and, unusually for a wader, migrating mainly on oceanic routes and wintering at sea on tropical oceans.

Taxonomy
In 1750, the English naturalist George Edwards included an illustration and a description of the red phalarope in the third volume of his A Natural History of Uncommon Birds. He used the English name "The Red-footed Tringa". Edwards based his hand-coloured etching on a preserved specimen that had been brought to London from the Hudson Bay area of Canada by James Isham. In 1758, the Swedish naturalist Carl Linnaeus updated his Systema Naturae for the tenth edition, he placed the red phalarope with phalaropes and sandpipers in the genus Tringa. Linnaeus included a brief description, coined the binomial name Tringa fulicaria and cited Edwards' work. The red phalarope is now one of three species placed in the genus Phalaropus that was introduced in 1760 by the French zoologist Mathurin Jacques Brisson. The species is monotypic: no subspecies are recognised.

The English and genus names for phalaropes come through French phalarope and scientific Latin Phalaropus from Ancient Greek phalaris, "coot", and pous, "foot". The specific fulicarius is from Latin fulica, "coot". Coots and phalaropes both have lobed toes.

Description

The breeding female is predominantly dark brown and black above, with red underparts and white cheek patches. The bill is yellow, tipped black. The breeding male is a duller version of the female. Young birds are light grey and brown above, with buff underparts and a dark patch through the eye. In winter, the plumage is essentially grey above and white below, but the black eyepatch is always present. The bill is black in winter. Their call is a short beek.

Breeding

The typical avian sex roles are reversed in the three phalarope species. Females are larger and more brightly coloured than males. The females pursue males, compete for nesting territory, and will aggressively defend their nests and chosen mates. Once the females lay their olive-brown eggs, they begin their southward migration, leaving the males to incubate the eggs and care for the young. Three to six eggs are laid in a ground nest near water. Incubation lasts 18 or 19 days. The young mainly feed themselves and are able to fly within 18 days of birth.

Behaviour
When feeding, a red phalarope will often swim in a small, rapid circle, forming a small whirlpool. This behaviour is thought to aid feeding by raising food from the bottom of shallow water. The bird will reach into the outskirts of the vortex with its bill, plucking small insects or crustaceans caught up therein. They sometimes fly up to catch insects in flight. On the open ocean, they are found in areas where converging ocean currents produce upwellings and are often found near groups of whales. Outside of the nesting season they often travel in flocks.

This species is often very tame and approachable.

Status and conservation
The red phalarope is one of the species to which the Agreement on the Conservation of African-Eurasian Migratory Waterbirds (AEWA) applies.

References

External links

 Red phalarope at eNature.com
 Red phalarope stamps from Iceland, Kiribati and Sierra Leone at bird-stamps.org
 
 
 
 
 
 Red phalarope - Phalaropus fulicarius - USGS Patuxent Bird Identification InfoCenter
 
 
 

Phalaropus
Wading birds
Birds of the Arctic
Phalarope, Red
Birds of Iceland
Birds described in 1758
Taxa named by Carl Linnaeus
Holarctic birds